Kofi Anyidoho (born 25 July 1947) is a Ghanaian poet and academic who comes from a family tradition of Ewe poets and oral artists. He is currently Professor of Literature at the University of Ghana.

He has received numerous awards for his poetry, including the Valco Fund Literary Award, the Langston Hughes Prize, the BBC Arts and Africa Poetry Award, the Fania Kruger Fellowship for Poetry of Social Vision, Poet of the Year (Ghana), and the Ghana Book Award.

Biography 
Born in Wheta, in Ghana's Volta Region, Anyidoho was educated in Ghana and the USA, and holds a B.A. Honours degree in English & Linguistics from the University of Ghana, Legon, an M.A. in Folklore from Indiana University Bloomington and gained his PhD in Comparative Literature at the University of Texas at Austin.

Having trained as a teacher at Accra Training College and at the Advanced Teacher Training College-Winneba, he taught primary, middle and secondary school, before joining the University of Ghana-Legon. Currently the Professor of Literature in the English Department, he has also been Director of the CODESRIA African Humanities Institute Program, acting Director of the School of Performing Arts and Head of the English Department. He was installed as the first occupant of the Kwame Nkrumah Chair in African Studies at the University of Ghana on 18 March 2010.

Poetry 
Kofi Anyidoho's poetry is respected as distinct in the way he weaves modernity into tradition and inspires hope by extending the three-chord rope of Ewe oral tradition. He not only writes with the background of Ewe oral tradition experiences but also enacts the very performance and oration of his poems in griotic style.
 Elegy for the Revolution (1978)
 A Harvest of Our Dreams (1985), Heinemann (paperback 1998), 
 Earthchild (1985), Woeli Publishing, 
 Ancestral Logic and Caribbean Blues (1992), Africa World Press, 
 Praise Song for the Land: Poems of Hope & Love & Care (2002). Foreword by Kofi Awoonor
 The Place We Call Home and Other Poems (2011)

Writing 
Anyidoho's academic writing includes:
 The Pan African Ideal in Literatures of the Black World, Accra: Ghana Universities Press, 1989
 Transcending Boundaries: the diaspora experience in African heritage literatures, Evanston: Northwestern University, 1995
 The Word Behind Bars and the Paradox of Exile, Northwestern University Press (1997), 
 Kofi Anyidoho and James Gibbs (eds), Fontomfrom. Contemporary Ghanaian Literature, Theatre and Film, Editions Rodopi B.V. (2000), 
 Poetry as Dramatic Performance in Tejumola Olaniyan and Ato Quayson's African Literature: An Anthology of Criticism and Theory

References

Sources 
 Simon Gikandi, Encyclopedia of African Literature, Routledge (2002), p. 24, .
 Dominic Head, The Cambridge Guide to Literature in English, Cambridge University Press (2006), p. 35, .
 "Poetry Africa Festival", Centre for Creative Arts, University of KwaZulu-Natal.

1947 births
Living people
Ghanaian male poets
Ewe people
20th-century Ghanaian poets
21st-century Ghanaian poets
International Writing Program alumni
20th-century male writers
21st-century male writers
Indiana University Bloomington alumni
Ghanaian expatriates in the United States